Ctenium aromaticum is a species of grass known by the common name toothache grass. It is native to the southeastern United States, where it grows on the coastal plain.

This is a perennial grass that forms clumps of stems reaching 1 to 1.5 meters in maximum height. The leaves are up to 46 centimeters long. The inflorescence is a panicle with one branch that is up to 15 centimeters long and lined on one side with two rows of spikelets. Each spikelet is roughly a centimeter long.

It is not known whether or not the grass was ever used as a remedy for toothache. It has, however, been used as a sialagogue, an agent that increases saliva. The crushed roots have a strong scent. The lower part of the stem produces a numbing sensation when it is chewed. The agents responsible for this action are isobutylamides.

References

External links
USDA Plants Profile
NatureServe

Chloridoideae